The Russian Museum of Ethnography (Российский этнографический музей) is a museum in St. Petersburg that houses a collection of about 500,000 items relating to the ethnography, or cultural anthropology, of peoples of the former Russian Empire and the Soviet Union.

The museum was set up in 1902 as the ethnographic department of the Russian Museum. It is housed in a purpose-built Neoclassical building erected between 1902 and 1913 to Vasily Svinyin's design in the proximity of the Mikhailovsky Palace (which accommodates the art collection of the Russian Museum). It occupies the place of the eastern service wing, the stables and the laundry of the palace.

The museum's first exhibits were the gifts received by the Russian Tsars from peoples of Imperial Russia. These were supplemented by regular expeditions to various parts of the Russian Empire which began in 1901. Further exhibits were purchased by Nicholas II of Russia and other members of his family (as state financing was not enough to purchase new exhibits). A collection of Buddhist religious objects was acquired for the museum by Prince Esper Ukhtomsky. Prince Tenishev, a wealthy industrialist, donated to the museum the archives of his private ethnographic bureau that had been documenting the life of Russian peasants since the 19th century.

The collection was not officially opened to the general public until 1923 and was not detached from the Russian Museum until 1934. When the Museum of the Peoples of the USSR in Moscow (successor to the Dashkov Museum) was shut down in 1948, its collections were transferred to the Ethnographic Museum in Leningrad. This museum should not be confused with the much older Museum of Anthropology and Ethnography, popularly known as the Kunstkamera.

References

External links 
 
 

Ethnographic museums in Saint Petersburg
Museums established in 1902
Neoclassical architecture in Russia
Russian Museum
Cultural heritage monuments of federal significance in Saint Petersburg